Pileostegia viburnoides, the climbing hydrangea, is a species of flowering plant in the family Hydrangeaceae, native to India and eastern Asia.

The specific epithet viburnoides means "like a viburnum", though viburnums belong to a different family of plants.

The species is valued in cultivation for its ability to clothe east- or north-facing surfaces, which can be problematic due to low light levels.

References

Hydrangeaceae
Flora of temperate Asia
Taxa named by Joseph Dalton Hooker